The North–South–East–West Corridor (NS-EW) is the largest ongoing highway project in India. It is the second phase of the National Highways Development Project (NHDP), and consists of building 7300 kilometers of four/six lane highways associating Srinagar, Kanyakumari, Kochi, Porbandar and Silchar, at a cost of US$12.317 billion (at 1999 prices). , 6875 of the 7142 kilometers project has been finished. 

But In Salem to Kochi stretch of Tamilnadu state the road is not yet 4 lane. It also have 12 feet narrow bridge at Madhukkarai taluk of Coimbatore. 

In combination with the Golden Quadrilateral network, and port connectivity highways, the NS-EW Corridor forms a key part of the Indian highway network, connecting many of its important manufacturing, commerce and cultural centers. As of May 2012, India has completed and placed in use some 15,800 kilometers of such 4-lane highways.

The NS–EW project is managed by the National Highways Authority of India under the Ministry of Road Transport and Highways.

Route 
Only National Highways are used in the two corridors.

North–South Corridor
This is a  corridor via NH 44 (Srinagar-Udhampur-pot Jammu–Jalandhar–Delhi–Agra–Gwalior–Jhansi–Sagar–Narsinghpur-Lakhnadon–Nagpur-Hyderabad-Chikkaballapur-Bengaluru-Salem–Madurai-Kanyakumari), branch road NH 544 (Salem–Coimbatore–Palakkad-Kochi)

East-West Corridor

This is a   corridor via NH 27 (Porbandar–Rajkot-Samakhiali–Radhanpur–Kota–Jhansi–Kanpur-Lucknow–Ayodhya-Gorakhpur-Muzaffarpur–Darbhanga-Supaul-Purnia– Dalkhola-Kishanganj, Islampur–Sonapur- Ghoshpukur-Jalpaiguri 
Alipurduar- Bongaigaon - Nalbari  Bijni–Guwahati–Nagaon–Dabaka–Silchar).

Interchange points between the corridors 

The following is an interchange section
Jhansi is the junction of North–South and East–West Corridors.
The following stretches are common between the Golden Quadrilateral and the NS-EW Corridors.
Delhi–Agra: Golden Quadrilateral & North–South Corridor
Bengaluru–Krishnagiri: Golden Quadrilateral & North–South Corridor
Akbarpur–Kanpur: Golden Quadrilateral & East–West Corridor
Udaipur–Chittorgarh: Golden Quadrilateral & East West Corridor
 The following is a Spur Highway of the North–South Corridor
Kochi–Coimbatore–Salem(NH 544): North–South Corridor & North–South Corridor Extension

Major cities

Possible extensions
There is popular demand for the extension of the East West Corridor from Silchar to Moreh via Jiribam and Imphal, and from Nagaon to Stilwell Road via Jorhat, Dibrugarh, Tinsukia and Ledo. These two extensions may increase the cross border trade with South East Asia.

Current status 

Chainage Chart of Corridor North – South
Chainage Chart of Corridor East – West

Gallery

See also 

 Similar rail development
 Future of rail transport in India, rail development

 Similar roads development
 Bharatmala
 Diamond Quadrilateral, Subsumed in Bharatmala
 Golden Quadrilateral, completed national road development connectivity older scheme
 National Highways Development Project, Subsumed in Bharatmala
 India-China Border Roads, Subsumed in Bharatmala
 Expressways of India
 Setu Bharatam, river road bridge development in India

 Similar ports and river transport development
 Indian Rivers Inter-link
 List of National Waterways in India
 Sagar Mala project, national water port development connectivity scheme

 Similar air transport development
 Indian Human Spaceflight Programme
 UDAN, national airport development connectivity scheme

 Highways in India
 List of National Highways in India by highway number
 List of National Highways in India

 General
 Transport in India

References

External links 
 NHDP Map with completion status

 
National highways in India
Transport in Srinagar
Transport in Porbandar
Transport in Silchar
Transport in Kanyakumari